Wistow  may refer to:

 Wistow, Cambridgeshire, England
 Wistow, Leicestershire, England
 Wistow, North Yorkshire, England
 Wistow, South Australia